is a Japanese kabuki play in seven acts by Kawatake Mokuami that premièred at the Ichimura-za theatre in Edo during the New Year 1860.  It is popularly known as Sannin Kichisa, and belongs to the sewamono and shiranamimono genres.

The play was not well-received; thirty years later it was re-performed in an abbreviated version called , dropping a scene in the pleasure quarters (遊郭) in Yoshiwara that had made up a part of the original title.  This revived version was a hit and has become a representative work that continues to be performed.

Kabuki plays